Wakasegawa Yoshimitsu (born Wataru Sato; July 28, 1962 - October 8, 2011) was a sumo wrestler from Sakata, Yamagata, Japan. He made his professional debut in 1978, reaching the top makuuchi division for the first time in 1983. His highest rank was maegashira 1. He retired in 1992 and worked in the restaurant business after leaving sumo.

Career

He was recruited by former ozeki Kiyokuni in 1978, who had taken over Isegahama stable the previous year. He made his first appearance on the dohyo  in March 1978, and he rose through the lower ranks fairly quickly. He first reached the sekitori ranks in September 1980, having won the makushita division championship with a perfect 7-0 record in the previous tournament. However he lasted only one tournament in juryo before being demoted, and after missing the first two tournaments of 1981 he fell to the bottom of the makushita division. He came back strongly to earn promotion back to the juryo division in March 1982, and he took his first yusho or tournament championship in that division in July 1982 with an 11-4 record. He reached the top division for the first time in January 1983 at the age of just 20. To make the occasion he changed the second part of his shikona or fighting name from his own given name of Wataru to Taiji.

Wakasegawa was regarded as a wrestler with great promise. However, after reaching what proved to be his highest ever rank of maegashira 1 in 
July 1983, he fell back to the juryo division in November 1983 after withdrawing from the tournament with a dislocated shoulder. After developing diabetes his performances suffered and he remained in juryo for most of the next four years. In 1986 he visited the Yokota Air Base with his colleagues from Isegahama stable to take part in exhibition bouts with American schoolchildren.  He reappeared in makuuchi in July 1987 (changing part of his shikona again, from Taiji to Yoshimitsu) but only for one tournament. After winning his third juryo championship in March 1988 with a 13-2 record he earned promotion to makuuchi for the fourth time, finally establishing himself as a top division regular. He never won a sansho or special prize, but did defeat yokozuna Onokuni in November 1988 to earn a kinboshi. He also defeated ozeki Konishiki in this tournament. He injured his back during the March 1989 tournament  after taking part in a strenuous training session with junior wrestler Akebono, later to become a yokozuna. Upon the demotion of Ozutsu in January 1992 he became the man with the earliest top division experience left in makuuchi (although his service was not continuous). He was to lose top division status himself in May of that year after suffering from gastroenteritis, and retired just one tournament after that.

Retirement from sumo

Although Wakasegawa was qualified to become an oyakata or coach, he was unable to purchase the necessary elder stock and so left the sumo world upon retirement in July 1992. He ran a ramen restaurant before having to give it up due to poor health. Having suffered from diabetes for many years, he died in 2011 at the age of 49.

Fighting style
Wakasegawa was a straightforward yotsu-sumo wrestler, preferring to use grappling techniques to pushing or thrusting. He won most of his bouts with a simple yori-kiri, or force out, but he also liked tsuki-otoshi (thrust over), Tsuki-dashi (thrust out), hiki-ostoshi (pull down) and various nage or throws. His skill on the mawashi was noted by experts.

Career record

See also
Glossary of sumo terms
List of past sumo wrestlers
List of sumo tournament second division champions

References

1962 births
Japanese sumo wrestlers
Sumo people from Yamagata Prefecture
2011 deaths